Yara, is a Mexican telenovela produced by Ernesto Alonso for Televisa in 1979. Starring by Angélica María, Jaime Moreno, Alma Muriel and Eric del Castillo.

Cast 
Angélica María as Yara
Alma Muriel
Jaime Moreno as Eladio
Blanca Guerra as Regina
Miguel Manzano
Carlos Ancira
Rosa María Moreno as Amelia
Sergio Ramos as El Cachetes
Juan Peláez
Aurora Clavell as Sabina
Eric del Castillo as Juan Carlos
Sergio Gómez
Roberto Antunez as Liborio
Ignacio Rubiell
Rossy Mendoza as Rossy
Frank Moro as Mauricio
Manuel Guizar
Guillermo Gil
Fausto Fierro
Gustavo del Castillo
Tito Duran
Laura León
Graciela Doring
Guillermo Zarur

References

External links 

Mexican telenovelas
1979 telenovelas
Televisa telenovelas
Spanish-language telenovelas
1979 Mexican television series debuts
1979 Mexican television series endings